The 1952 United States presidential election in Wyoming took place on November 4, 1952, as part of the 1952 United States presidential election. State voters chose three representatives, or electors, to the Electoral College, who voted for president and vice president.

Wyoming was won by Columbia University President Dwight D. Eisenhower (R–New York), running with Senator Richard Nixon, with 62.71 percent of the popular vote, against Adlai Stevenson (D–Illinois), running with Senator John Sparkman, with 38.93 percent of the popular vote.

Results

Results by county

See also
 United States presidential elections in Wyoming

References

Wyoming
1952
1952 Wyoming elections